The 2019 UCI Cyclo-cross World Championships were the World Championship for cyclo-cross for the season 2018–19. These were held in Bogense in Denmark on 2 and 3 February 2019. The championships featured five events; men's races for elite, under-23 and junior riders, and women's races for elite and under-23 riders.

Schedule
All times are local (UTC+1).

Participants

Medal summary

Medals table

Medalists

References

External links

 
UCI Cyclo-cross World Championships
World Championship
UCI Cyclo-cross World Championships
International cycle races hosted by Denmark
Sport in Funen
UCI Cyclo-cross World Championships